Tyler Ewing (born September 14, 1984) is an American television composer. He is best known for his work with Guiding Light, As the World Turns, The Oprah Winfrey Show, and The Nate Berkus Show. In 2007 he composed the Fight Song for his Alma Mater, Belmont University.

Partial discography
 Jim Brickman: Romanza (2011 – Cello, Assistant Engineering)
 Jim Brickman: All is Calm (2011 – Cello)
 Eric Michael: The Wedding Song EP (2011 – Producer, Piano, Cello)
 Ben Utecht: Christmas Hope – An Inspirational Holiday Collection (2011 – Cello, Assistant Engineer, String Engineer)
 Eric Michael: Beginnings (2007 – Producer, Programming)

References

External links

 
 Tyler Ewing at Artist Direct
 official site

1984 births
Living people
American male composers
21st-century American composers
21st-century American male musicians